Nicholas Dimitri Constantine Galitzine (born 29 September 1994) is a British actor and singer. known for his roles in High Strung (2016), Handsome Devil (2016), Cinderella (2021) and Purple Hearts (2022).

Early life
Galitzine's father, Geoffrey Galitzine, was a city financier whose business interests include a glass-recycling business. His mother, Lora (née Papayanni), also a financier, is Greek. His sister, Lexi Galitzine, is an illustrator and interior stylist. He was a student at Dulwich College and was part of a youth theatre company, Pleasance Islington.

In his childhood, Galitzine played rugby and football, and participated in county-level athletics competitions.

Career
Galitzine got his first role in the film The Beat Beneath My Feet in 2014, starring alongside Luke Perry. He also performed several songs for the original soundtrack of the movie.

In 2015, he appeared in one episode of the TV series Legends. He was named "Star of Tomorrow" by Screen International.

In 2016, he starred in the American drama High Strung, in which he played a young violinist who performs in a subway station. He played a young closeted gay student in the Irish comedy-drama Handsome Devil, which was later nominated for five awards at the 15th Irish Film & Television Awards.

In 2017, he took part in the New Zealand mystery drama The Changeover. In The Watcher in the Woods, he played opposite the Academy Award-winning American actress, Anjelica Huston.

Galitzine was cast for his first major TV role in the Netflix horror drama series Chambers. In 2019, he played in the drama film Share.

In 2020, he played the bisexual teenager Timmy in The Craft: Legacy, which is a sequel to The Craft. In 2021, he also played Prince Robert in Cinderella, appearing on 7 songs on the soundtrack of movie.

In 2022, Galitzine was cast as one of the leads in the movie adaptation of romance novel Red, White, & Royal Blue, playing the fictional Prince Henry of Wales opposite Taylor Zakhar Perez. His debut single "Comfort" was released on June 24, 2022. He also starred in the Netflix movie Purple Hearts, which was released July 29, 2022. He is set to star alongside Anne Hathaway  in  The Idea of You.

Personal life
Galitzine lives in Hammersmith, London, England.

Filmography

Film

Television

Discography

Singles
As main artist

Promotional singles

Other appearances

References

External links
 
 

1994 births
Living people
21st-century British male actors
English male film actors
English male television actors
English male voice actors
English people of American descent
English people of Greek descent
English people of Russian descent
Nicholas
Male actors from London
Male actors of American descent